Odd Hours is the fourth novel in the Odd Thomas series by Dean Koontz. It was released on May 20, 2008.

Plot summary

After leaving the monastery in the previous book, Odd found a place to stay in Magic Beach with a retired actor. While out for a walk one morning, he finds a woman whom he had been seeing in his dreams; a young, pregnant woman who calls herself Annamaria. After being assaulted and nearly killed by a large man with two henchmen in tow, Odd is separated from Annamaria, though he uses his psychic magnetism to find her. Once he finds her they decide they need to leave immediately, but while making preparations to do so they hear a car door slam. They manage to find a spot to hide until after the men who had been chasing them leave. With the men now gone, Odd and Annamaria set out walking. On their walk, they encounter a large pack of coyotes that Annamaria somehow persuades to leave. After leaving Annamaria with a trusted friend, Odd flees to a local church where he is subsequently turned over to the sheriff of Magic Beach, but not before he hides his ID in a church pew. The sheriff, a man who seems to have many personalities, believes Odd is a government agent who has come to spy on his operation: the delivery and shipment of multiple nuclear weapons to terrorist groups inside the US via the Magic Beach harbor. Odd manages to convince the Sheriff that he is a government experiment gone wrong and that he is willing to be bribed in order to look the other way. While the sheriff is setting up a transaction to buy his loyalty Odd manages to enrage the spirit of Frank Sinatra, who began accompanying him after the departure of Elvis. The rage caused by his spirit creates a violent whirlwind, and in the confusion Odd is able to escape from the police department.

He quickly makes his way down to the harbor and is able to board the craft that is carrying the nukes. Though he does not want to, he is forced to kill everyone on board, as there is no other way to secure the ship and its dangerous cargo. Odd manages to run the boat aground in a nearby cove and ensures that the Coast Guard, DHS, and FBI are all aware of what the boat contains.  Odd returns to the church to retrieve his ID, but is surprised by the sheriff when leaving.  While attempting to escape, he runs into the priest and his wife. Odd learns that both the priest and his wife were also involved with the plan to sell nuclear weapons through Magic Beach. The priest kills his wife and is then killed by the sheriff, who is in turn killed by one of his henchmen. The henchman, identified primarily as 'Meth Mouth' talks to Odd, still believing him to be a psychic government agent. While laughing over a joke of Meth Mouth's, Odd shoots him under the table with the wife's gun.

The story ends with Odd and Annamaria leaving Magic Beach. Odd is sobbing over the murder of so many people, almost all at his hands. Annamaria comforts him with the knowledge that while he may have ended a few lives, he saved millions more. She then pulls the car over and asks Odd to show her the constellation Cassiopeia. Odd and Stormy would often point out Cassiopeia together as that was Stormy's mother's name, so Annamaria's request startles him, but he points the constellation out to her.

Webisodes
A four-part series debuting in April 2008, Odd Passenger detailed events between Brother Odd and Odd Hours. They were produced by Escape Goat Pictures (www.rungoatrun.com) and were directed by Jack Paccione Jr., with Odd being played by Anthony Marks.

Connections to Koontz's other works
At the start of the book, Odd is wearing a sweatshirt with the words MYSTERY TRAIN on it. Later, he changes to a T-shirt with WYVERN on the front. These are references to the Moonlight Bay Trilogy and suggest a possible link between the two series.

Notes

External links

 Episode 1 of the Odd Passenger
 Episode 2 of the Odd Passenger
 Episode 3 of the Odd Passenger
 Episode 4 of the Odd Passenger

2008 American novels
Novels by Dean Koontz
Novels about precognition